The Bankfin Nite Series was a rugby union competition in South Africa. There were two editions of this competition, in 1996 and 1997. It was sponsored by Bankfin, who also sponsored the Currie Cup competitions. After two seasons, it was succeeded by the Vodacom Cup competition.

In 1996, there were twelve competing teams – ten of the fourteen provincial unions, plus teams from Namibia and Zimbabwe.

Namibia and Zimbabwe withdrew from the 1997 competition, while  replaced defending champions , who in turn replaced Western Province in the 1997 Super 12 season. Western Province won the competition, beating Western Cape rivals  36–25 in the final.

Season Summary

The summaries for the two Bankfin Nite Series seasons are as follows:

Each team's results in the competition are listed below:

Seasons

1996 Bankfin Nite Series

There were twelve teams in the 1996 Bankfin Nite Series. They were divided into two sections of six teams each. Each team played all the teams in the other section twice over the course of the season, once at home and once away.

Teams received five points for a win, two points for a draw and one point for a loss. Bonus points were also awarded based on the number of tries scored – 4 bonus points were awarded for scoring ten or more tries in a match, 3 bonus points for scoring six to nine tries, 2 bonus points for scoring four or five tries and 1 bonus point for scoring two or three tries in a match. Teams were ranked by log points, then points difference (points scored less points conceded).

The top two teams in each section qualified for the title play-off semi-finals. The team that finished first in each section had home advantage against the team that the team that finished second in the other section, with the semi-final winners advancing to the final.

The following fixtures were played in the 1996 Bankfin Nite Series:

Semi-finals

Final

1997 Bankfin Nite Series

There were ten teams in the 1997 Bankfin Nite Series. Each team played all the other teams once over the course of the season, either at home or away.

Teams received four points for a win and two points for a draw. Bonus points were awarded to teams that scored four or more tries in a game, as well as to teams that lost a match by seven points or less. Teams were ranked by log points, then points difference (points scored less points conceded).

The top four teams qualified for the title play-off semi-finals. The team that finished first had home advantage against the team that finished fourth, while the team that finished second had home advantage against the team that finish third, with the semi-final winners advancing to the final.

The following fixtures were played in the 1997 Bankfin Nite Series:

Semi-finals

Final

References

1996 in South African rugby union
1996 rugby union tournaments for clubs
1997 in South African rugby union
1997 rugby union tournaments for clubs